James Halliday (April 3, 1845 – April 11, 1921) was a merchant and political figure in Ontario, Canada. He represented Bruce North in the House of Commons of Canada from 1901 to 1904 as a Conservative.

He was born in Burgess Township, Leeds County, Canada West, the son of James Halliday and Bessie Allan. In 1868, he married Katie Fisher. Halliday was also a cattle dealer. He served as a member of the council for Bruce County. He was elected to the House of Commons in a 1901 by-election held after the election of Alexander McNeill in 1900 was declared void.

References 

Members of the House of Commons of Canada from Ontario
Conservative Party of Canada (1867–1942) MPs
1845 births
1921 deaths